James R. Sears Jr. is a United States Air Force major general who serves as the deputy commander of Air Education and Training Command since July 2022. He most recently served as the Commander of the Air Force Operational Test and Evaluation Center. Previously, he was the Director of Plans, Programs, and Requirements of the Air Education and Training Command.

References

External links

}

}

Year of birth missing (living people)
Living people
Place of birth missing (living people)
United States Air Force generals
People from Reno, Nevada